Voroshilovsky (masculine), Voroshilovskaya (feminine), or Voroshilovskoye (neuter) may refer to:
Voroshilovsky District, name of several districts in the countries of the former Soviet Union
Voroshilovsky (inhabited locality) (Voroshilovskaya, Voroshilovskoye), name of several rural localities in Russia
Voroshilovskoye, former name of Alamudun, Kyrgyzstan